Sakurazawa (written: 桜沢 or 櫻澤 lit. "cherry blossom stream") is a Japanese surname. Notable people with the surname include:

 (born 1963), Japanese manga artist
Nyoiti Sakurazawa (1893–1966), advocate of Macrobiotics
 (born 1969), Japanese musician known by the stage name Sakura

See also
, train station in Yorii, Saitama Prefecture, Japan

Japanese-language surnames